"Loco Loco" is a song by Serbian girl group Hurricane. The song represented Serbia in the Eurovision Song Contest 2021 in Rotterdam, the Netherlands. The song qualified from the second semi-final on 20 May 2021, and placed 15th in the final with 102 points. Despite receiving low points from the national juries, the song still managed to reach 9th place in the televote.

Eurovision Song Contest

Internal selection 
On 17 December 2020, RTS confirmed that Hurricane would represent Serbia in the 2021 contest.

At Eurovision 
The 65th edition of the Eurovision Song Contest took place in Rotterdam, the Netherlands and consisted of two semi-finals on 18 and 20 May 2021, and the grand final on 22 May 2021. On 17 November 2020, it was announced that Serbia would be performing in the first half of the second semi-final of the contest.

Charts

References 

2021 songs
2021 singles
Eurovision songs of 2021
Eurovision songs of Serbia
Hurricane (Serbian band) songs
Songs written by Darko Dimitrov